MAPFRE Insurance is headquartered in Webster, Massachusetts, United States.  It was founded in 1972 as the Commerce Group; it was acquired in 2008 by Mapfre S.A.

MAPFRE Insurance writes property and casualty insurance in 19 states across the United States through a network of more than 4,200 independent agents and brokers.  MAPFRE Insurance is the 19th largest provider of personal automobile insurance and the 20th largest personal lines insurer in the United States.  MAPFRE Insurance is also the largest private passenger automobile insurer, homeowners’ insurer, and commercial automobile insurer in Massachusetts.   MAPFRE Insurance provides a full range of insurance products, including coverage for automobiles, homes, motorcycles, watercraft, and businesses, as well as term life insurance.  MAPFRE Insurance is part of the MAPFRE Group, an international insurer with business in 47 countries on five continents. The MAPFRE Group is the leading insurer in Spain. It is also the leading insurer in the non-life market in Latin America and the sixth-largest non-life insurer in Europe.  The MAPFRE Group has over 36,000 employees and over 23 million customers worldwide.  In 2014, the MAPFRE Group had net earnings of $1.1 billion with revenues of $34.8 billion.

History 

Commerce Insurance was founded in 1972 as a small insurance company in the south-central Massachusetts town of Webster, where the company is still located and headquartered.

In April 2007, Commerce entered the New York personal lines insurance market through its acquisition of SWICO Enterprises, Ltd., the holding company for Hempstead, New York-based (link) property and casualty insurer State-Wide Insurance Company. State-Wide Insurance Company primarily writes private passenger automobile insurance in the state of New York.

In June 2008, The Commerce Group, Inc. was acquired by Mapfre S.A.  Mapfre, based in Madrid, was founded in 1933 as a landowners' co-operative; it is now a public company and the largest insurance group in Latin America with a presence in 43 countries, and about 51,000 agents worldwide.

In January 2020, MAPFRE Insurance entered into an alliance with Banco Pichincha which operates in Colombia and Ecuador.

In February 2020, MAPFRE Insurance was involved in several claim cases due to Hurricane Maria in Puerto Rico.

In March 2020, MAPFRE Insurance's One Winthrop Sq. was acquired by Nan Fung Life Sciences Real Estate.

References

External links
 Official Website

1972 establishments in Massachusetts
Financial services companies established in 1972
Insurance companies based in Massachusetts
Insurance companies of the United States
Webster, Massachusetts
Companies based in Massachusetts